Nadezhda Valeryevna Skardino (born 27 March 1985) is a retired Belarusian biathlete. She represented Belarus at the 2010 Winter Olympics in Vancouver, the 2014 Winter Olympics in Sochi and the 2018 Winter Olympics in Pyeongchang. She won a bronze medal in the individual competition at the 2014 Winter Olympics.
She won a gold medal in the 4×6 km relay at the 2018 Olympics In the 2017–2018 season Skardino won the Individual World Cup.

World Cup

References

External links
IBU's profile of Nadezhda Skardino

1985 births
Belarusian female biathletes
Olympic biathletes of Belarus
Biathletes at the 2010 Winter Olympics
Biathletes at the 2014 Winter Olympics
Biathletes at the 2018 Winter Olympics
Living people
Biathlon World Championships medalists
Medalists at the 2014 Winter Olympics
Medalists at the 2018 Winter Olympics
Olympic gold medalists for Belarus
Olympic bronze medalists for Belarus
Olympic medalists in biathlon
Universiade medalists in biathlon
Sportspeople from Saint Petersburg
Universiade silver medalists for Belarus
Competitors at the 2007 Winter Universiade